The Paleontological Museum Megatherium is a museum in the province of Santa Elena in Ecuador, located in the Universidad Estatal Península de Santa Elena. It is considered the first museum of paleontology in Ecuador. The museum presents an exhibition on the remains of Late Pleistocene (50,000–8,000 BCE) megafauna found in the Tank Loma sector of La Libertad Canton, one of the sites of the most important fossils in South America.

Exhibition
The exhibition displays archaeological and cultural artifacts dating back 17,000 years that were found in the Tank Loma sector. Included are the fossils of the terrestrial giant sloth and many other mammals of considerable size, as well as members of the genera Macrauchenia, American mastodon, and the eponymous Megatherium.

References

External links
 Official website

 Museums in Ecuador
 Fossil museums
 Archaeological museums in Ecuador